Chicoreus orchidiflorus is a species of sea snail, a marine gastropod mollusk in the family Muricidae, the murex snails or rock snails.

Description

Distribution

References

External links
 To Encyclopedia of Life
 To World Register of Marine Species

Gastropods described in 1973
Chicoreus